Christopher Martin Davis (born 1 March 1994) is a competitive ice dancer for Bulgaria. With partner Mina Zdravkova, he is the 2020 Bulgarian Ice Dance Champion, Silver Medallist at 2020 Jégvirág Cup, Bronze Medallist at 2019 NRW Trophy, and the Bulgarian representative at the 2020 European Figure Skating Championships and 2021 World Figure Skating Championships. Originally a U.S. citizen, Davis became a naturalized Bulgarian citizen in 2019 and has demonstrated his knowledge of the Bulgarian language in television interviews.

Personal life 
Davis was born in Chicago, Illinois. He studied communications at the University of Florida. He abides by a vegan diet and has collaborated with Peta to promote ethical eating. He believes that figure skating should be a welcoming place for diverse groups of athletes, and advocates for adult skating, for inclusive programing for athletes with disabilities, and for the mitigation of elitism and exclusivity in the sport. He is a trustee of the charity Inclusive Skating.

Early career 
Davis started skating in 1999 in hockey courses at The Robert Crown Community Center in Evanston Illinois. He started training in ice dancing in 2008 with Angelina Giordano under coach Christopher Hyland. With Giordano, Davis won the 2010 US Junior National Title at the juvenile level. Giordano and Davis terminated their partnership in 2012 due to different goals. His early career coaches included: Christopher Hyland, Jamie Whyte, Eve Chalom, Kendra Goodwin, Benjamin Delmas and Christophe Lecomte.

Career 
In 2014 Davis partnered with Mina Zdravkova.Together they won the 2014/15 Bulgarian junior ice dance title.  In 2015, Davis sustained a serious shoulder injury for which he underwent keyhole surgery in the USA. Post surgery, a significant recovery and rehab period was required away from the ice. The surgery was not successful, and the injury returned early in the 2016/17 season.  A second surgery was conducted in Bulgaria in 2016 and was successful at abating any further problems. Starting in 2016 Zdravkova and Davis were coached solely by Marika Humphreys-Baranova and Vitaliy Baranov. Zdravkova and Davis returned to national level competition at the 2016/17 Bulgarian figure skating championships where they reclaimed their title.In 2018 Zdravkova and Davis first performed a program set to Bulgarian folk music. Their performance of this program at the 2019 Winter Universiade went viral in Bulgaria in 2019, amassing millions of views. During the 2019/20 season, Zdravkova and Davis qualified and competed at the 2020 European Figure Skating Championships placing 25th. The team also qualified for the 2020 World figure skating championships, but the event was cancelled due to COVID-19.Due to COVID-19 Zdravkova and Davis were unable to train on the ice for over 7 months. During this time they trained off-ice and made several PSAs for Bulgarian media urging compliance with public health safety measures. In December 2020, the Bulgarian National Championships were postponed until February 2021. Zdravkova and Davis reclaimed their title and were named to the world team. Zdravkova and Davis competed at the 2021 World Figure Skating Championships which were held in a bubble for the first time due to COVID-19 safety precautions, and placed 31st.

Programs - with Mina Zdravkova

Results - with Mina Zdravkova for Bulgaria

References

External links 
 Beauty in Sport Social Media Article from Winter Universiade 2019
 www.iceskating.london

1994 births
Living people
Bulgarian male ice dancers
Competitors at the 2019 Winter Universiade
Figure skaters from Chicago